Swayamvar Season 3, introduced as Ratan Ka Rishta on Imagine TV, is a marriage reality television show in India. It is the third season of Swayamvar. Bride of the season is Ratan Rajput. The show name is based on her name. It premiered on 30 May 2011.

Winner
Abhinav Sharma won the show. He hails from Uttranchal and professionally is a Software Engineer. Though the couple haven't married, they announced that they are engaged.

Contestants
Pardeep Babbar
Anupam Singh Kushwah- finalist
Abhimanyu Singh 
Abhinav Sharma- Winner
Rohit Mittal
Deepak Pandit- finalist
Gaurav Jaggi 
pankaj Soni
Rohit Jain 
Suresh Tumula
Rahul Wahal
Syed Shoaib Hussain Sabri
Ritesh Jaiswal
Sudhanshu Tiwari
Kunal Madhivala

Guests
The Following were the Guests that visited Ratan Ka Rishta:
Dolly Bindra               
Ram Kapoor
Sudesh Berry
Sushmita Mukherjee
Ali Asgar
Rakshanda Khan
Ragini Khanna
Mona Singh
Sunil Grover
Rashmi Desai
Nandish Sandhu
Rakhi Sawant
Rahul Mahajan 
Dimpy Mahajan
Supriya Kumari
Supriya Pilgaonkar
Sachin Pilgaonkar
T.P. Sinha the face reader

References

Indian reality television series
Imagine TV original programming